The Algeria national under-17 football team (Arabic: منتخب الجزائر لكرة القدم تحت 17 سنة) is the national representative for Algeria in international under-17 football competition, and is controlled by the Algerian Football Federation. The team competes in the Africa U-17 Cup of Nations, UNAF U-17 Tournament, and the FIFA U-17 World Cup, which is held every two years. The under-17 team also participates in local and international friendly tournaments. The team is currently coached by Rezki Remane.

History

Honours 
CAF U-17 Championship:
Runners-up (1): 2009

UNAF U-17 Tournament:
Winners (4): 2006, 2008, 2012, 2021
Runners-up (3): 2008, 2009, 2011

Arab Cup U-17
Winners (1): 2022

Tournament Records

FIFA U-16 and U-17 World Cup record

CAF U-17 Championship record

UNAF U-17 Tournament record

CAF U-16 and U-17 World Cup Qualifiers record

Arab Cup U-17 record

Current squad

See also 
 Algeria national football team
 Algeria national under-23 football team
 Algeria national under-20 football team
 African Under-17 Championship

References

External links 
 Algerian Football Association - official site 

African national under-17 association football teams
under-17
Youth football in Algeria